Twelfth Night is a studio album released by UK neo-progressive band Twelfth Night in 1986. Although officially untitled, it is known informally as both XII and The Virgin Album. The number "XII" was printed vertically on the album cover with the words "Twelfth Night" inserted horizontally between the two "I's". Some discographies quote the album's title as X, apparently misinterpreting the "I's" as simply horizontal lines framing the band's name.

Details
The long-awaited first full-length album with Andy Sears on vocals and after the band had signed a major contract at last, was released without a title, something the band weren't very happy with.

Disappointed with the lack of major-label support, both Andy Sears and Clive Mitten had left the band by the beginning of 1987.

This album was not released on CD for almost twenty years due to an apparent contractual dispute, although one track from the album appeared on the original version of the Collector's Item CD, and another was added on the reissue. The band indicated that if they were unable to reacquire the original recordings they might re-form in order to re-record the entire album for CD. In the event, the Virgin-EMI catalogue team invited Andy Revell, Andy Sears and Brian Devoil to meet with Peter Mew for a re-mastering session at Abbey Road Studios, and it was finally issued on CD in July 2005.

Track listing
All songs written by Twelfth Night.
 "Last Song" - 4.27
 "Pressure" - 3.39 
 "Jungle" - 4.16 
 "The Craft" - 4.36 
 "Blue Powder Monkey" - 5.07  
 "Theatre" - 3.48 
 "Shame" - 4.13 
 "This Is War" - 3.45 
 "Take a Look" - 11.35

2005 CD reissue
As above, plus:
  "Blondon Fair" - 6.03
 "Shame (full Mix)" - 5.50
 "Take a Look (part 4)" - 4.19
 "Blue Powder Monkey" (early mix) - 4.46
 "This Is War" (early mix) - 3.48
 "The Craft" (early mix) - 4.47

Personnel
Andy Sears — vocals
Andy Revell — guitars
Rick Battersby — keyboards
Clive Mitten — bass; additional guitars on "Take A Look"
Brian Devoil — drums

References

1986 albums
Twelfth Night (band) albums
Virgin Records albums